Humberto Aranda (born 14 March 1966) is a Costa Rican former professional boxer who competed from 1992 to 2008, challenging for the WBC light middleweight title in 1999. As an amateur, he competed in the men's welterweight event at the 1988 Summer Olympics.

References

External links
 
 
 

1966 births
Living people
Welterweight boxers
Costa Rican male boxers
Olympic boxers of Costa Rica
Boxers at the 1988 Summer Olympics
Pan American Games competitors for Costa Rica
Boxers at the 1987 Pan American Games
Boxers at the 1991 Pan American Games
Sportspeople from San José, Costa Rica